Prince is a male given name.

Etymology

The etymology of the name is from the Anglo-Saxon name Prince which is from the Latin word princeps (“first one” or “leader”).

The name comes from its first bearer, who was a person who acted in a formal and regal manner, or who had won the title of prince in some sort of contest.

Artists and entertainers

Musicians
 Prince (musician) (1958–2016), American singer-songwriter born Prince Rogers Nelson
 Prince Adekunle (born 1942), Nigerian musician
 Prince Bright, Ghanaian musician
 Prince Eke (born 1981), Nigerian actor
 Prince Harvey, American rapper
 Prince McCoy (1882–1968), American singer
 Prince Kudakwashe Musarurwa (born 1988), Zimbabwean musician
 Prince Udaya Priyantha (1970–2017), Sinhalese singer
 Prince Robinson (1902–1960), American saxophone player

Other artists and entertainers
 Prince Abdi (born 1982), British comedian
 Prince Amponsah (actor), Canadian actor
 Prince Bagdasarian (born 1984), American film director
 Prince Cecil, Indian actor
 Prince Demah (c. 1745-1778), American painter
 Prince Eke (born 1977), Nigerian actor
 Prince Gomolvilas (born 1972), American playwright
 Prince Gyasi (born 1995), Ghanaian visual artist
 Prince Hoare (elder) (1711–1769), sculptor
 Prince Hoare (younger) (1755–1834), painter and playwright
 Prince Narula (born 1990), Indian actor and model
 Prince Randian (1871–1934), Guyanese-born American sideshow performer

Athletes

Association footballers
 Prince Abedi (born 1985), Nigerian footballer
 Prince Obus Aggreh (born 1996), Nigerian footballer
 Prince Agyemang (born 1994), Ghanaian footballer
 Prince Amanda (born 2001), Tanzanian footballer
 Prince Koranteng Amoako (born 1973), Ghanaian footballer
 Prince Amponsah (footballer) (born 1996), Ghanaian footballer
 Prince Asubonteng (born 1986), Ghanaian footballer
 Prince Baffoe (born 1993), Ghanaian footballer
 Prince Mark Boley (born 1989), Liberian footballer
 Prince Bonkat (born 1996), Nigerian footballer
 Prince Buaben (born 1988), Ghanaian footballer
 Prince Daye (born 1978), Liberian footballer
 Prince Dube (born 1997), Zimbabwean footballer
 Prince Eboagwu (born 1986), Nigerian footballer
 Prince Efe Ehiorobo (born 1983), Nigerian footballer
 Prince Ikpe Ekong (born 1978), Nigerian footballer
 Prince Gyimah (born 1990), Ghanaian footballer
 Prince Hlela (born 1984), South African footballer
 Prince Ibara (born 1996), Congolese international footballer
 Prince Ihekwoaba (born 1989), Nigerian footballer
 Prince Nana (footballer), Ghanaian former footballer
 Prince Nnake (born 1989), Nigerian footballer 
 Prince Olomu (born 1986), Nigerian footballer
 Prince Oniangué (born 1988), French footballer
 Prince Osei Owusu (born 1997), German footballer

Gridiron/American football players
 Prince Amukamara (born 1989), American cornerback
 Prince Emili (born 1998), American football player
 Prince Charles Iworah (born 1993), American cornerback
 Prince Miller (born 1988), American cornerback
 Prince Tega Wanogho (born 1997), American football player

Boxers
 Prince Badi Ajamu (born 1972), American boxer
 Prince Amartey (born 1944), Ghanaian boxer
 Prince Arron (born 1987), English boxer

Other athletes
 Prince Amara (born 1973), Sierra Leonean sprinter
 Prince Bartholomew (1939-2017), Trinidad cricketer
 Prince Caperal (born 1993), Filipino basketball player
 Prince Fielder (born 1984), American baseball player
 Prince Iaukea (born 1964), American professional wrestler
 Prince Ibeh (born 1994), British basketball player
 Prince Nana (born 1979), American professional wrestler

Politicians
 Prince Ahmed Ali Ahmedzai (born 1968), Pakistani politician
 Prince Casinader (1926-2018), Sri Lankan politician and teacher
 Prince Johnson (born 1952), Liberian politician
 Prince Gopal Lakshman (1954-2016), Fijian politician
 Prince Hulon Preston Jr. (1908-1961), American politician
 Prince Raj (born 1989), Indian politician

Other
 Prince Julius Adewale Adelusi-Adeluyi (born 1940), Nigerian pharmacist, Minister of Health and Social Services and businessman
 Prince Boston (born 1750), American slave
 Prince Estabrook (1741-1830), American militiaman
 Prince Hall (1735-1807), African-American abolitionist
 Prince Romerson (c. 1840–1872), Hawaiian American Civil War soldier 
 Prince E. Rouse (1917–2003), American physical chemist

See also
Prince
Prince (surname)

Masculine given names